is a town located in Kuma District, Kumamoto Prefecture, Japan.

As of October 1, 2016, the town has an estimated population of 9,604 and a density of 58 persons per km². The total area is 165.87 km².

References

External links

Taragi official website 

Towns in Kumamoto Prefecture